Judy L. Clendening is a Canadian judge.

Clendening is a judge in the Canadian province of New Brunswick representing the judicial district of Woodstock, New Brunswick. In June, 2005, she ruled in favour of same-sex marriage rights in New Brunswick, and in November, 2013, ruled in favour of a court injunction forcing protestors of shale gas development to remain 20 metres away from the side of the road where the company is working, and 250 metres away from SWN trucks.

References

Judges in New Brunswick
People from Woodstock, New Brunswick
Canadian women judges
Living people
Year of birth missing (living people)